Tri Nations Series champion is the title given to the rugby union nation (either Australia, New Zealand, South Africa, or, since 2012, Argentina) that finishes at the top of competition table of the annual Tri Nations Series. The Bledisloe Cup, an Australian-New Zealand trophy is also awarded within the series.

Each nation plays each other thrice on a home and away basis, though the number of games against each side was expanded from two to three in 2006. A nation receives four points for a win, two for a draw and none for a loss. A nation can obtain a bonus point by either scoring four tries in a match or by losing by seven points or less to the opposition. If nations finish level on points (points for winning, drawing and bonus match points), the first tiebreaker is point differential (the actual in game scoreline, a cumulative scoreline difference). The scoreline difference is worked out by subtracting the number of points a nation has had scored against them from the total points they have scored in the series. Should teams still be level, this is followed by number of tries scored by a nation during the series.

The Tri Nations was created amongst the SANZAR partners (along with the provincial Super 12 competition, now, Super Rugby). The tournament involves three southern hemisphere nations; Australia, New Zealand and South Africa. The series was created to form a similar competition to the Six Nations Championship (then, the Five Nations). The first tournament was held in 1996, which New Zealand won. It has subsequently been held annually. The competition has largely been dominated by New Zealand, who have won 10 championships, whereas Australia and South Africa have each won the series three times. New Zealand has won consecutive championships on three occasions (1996–97, 2002–03, and 2005–08) and Australia on one occasion (2000–01).

Results

Tournaments (1996–2011; 2020)

Aggregate table

Notes

References
 "ALL-TIME TRI-NATIONS TABLE". iafrica.com. Retrieved 16 May 2006.
 "Tri-Nations history". bbc.co.uk. Retrieved 16 May 2006.
 "Fixtures & Results". scrum.com. Retrieved 16 May 2006.

External links
 Allblacks.com
 Rugby.com.au
 SA Rugby

The Rugby Championship